Robert Michael File (born January 28, 1977) is an American former professional baseball pitcher. He signed with the St. Louis Cardinals in 2005, retiring shortly after spring training with a back injury.

File was drafted as a third baseman out of NCAA Division II, then converted to pitcher while in the Jays' farm system.

File is a former pitching coach at La Salle University in Philadelphia. La Salle University competes at the NCAA Division I level in the Atlantic 10 baseball conference.

Pitching style and biography

File threw a 96 MPH four-seam fastball, a 91–94 MPH sinker, a 77–82 MPH slider, and a 78–80 MPH fosh (hybrid-splitfinger).

File is one of seven pitchers in major league history to win a game in his first appearance while throwing five pitches or fewer.

File was a standout infielder at Father Judge High School in Philadelphia before becoming a pitcher for the Toronto Blue Jays.

File was one of the top players in the history of Philadelphia University's (now Thomas Jefferson University) baseball program.
 Earned ABCA/Rawlings first-team All-American honors as a senior in 1998.
 Earned ECAC (East Coast Athletic Conference) Player of the Year honors as a senior in 1998.
 Three-time NYCAC (New York Collegiate Athletic Conference) All-Conference selection, earning Player of the Year honors in 1998.
 Set several school hitting records as a senior in 1998, including a .542 batting average.
 .542 batting average in 1998 was #1 in the country, leading all NCAA baseball.
 Also set single-season records with 90 hits, 63 runs, 68 RBI, 19 home runs, and 167 total bases in 1998.
 Is the university's all-time leader in nearly every career hitting category including runs (181), hits (296), triples (17) and home runs (37).

References

External links

1977 births
Living people
American expatriate baseball players in Canada
Baseball players from Philadelphia
Dunedin Blue Jays players
Major League Baseball pitchers
Medicine Hat Blue Jays players
Philadelphia Rams baseball players
Syracuse SkyChiefs players
Tennessee Smokies players
Toronto Blue Jays players
La Salle Explorers baseball coaches